Jonki  is a village in the administrative district of Gmina Konarzyny, within Chojnice County, Pomeranian Voivodeship, in northern Poland.

For details of the history of the region, see History of Pomerania.

The village has a population of 41.

During the years of 1975-1998, Jonki belonged to the Słupsk Voivodeship. 

Other places with a similar name to Jonki: Jonkowo

References

Jonki